Cubal do Lumbo is an Angolan commune.  It belongs to the municipality of  Bocoio, in the province of Benguela.

References 

Populated places in Benguela Province
Municipalities of Angola